Ennadai is a former populated place in the Kivalliq Region, Nunavut, Canada. Located on a peninsula that juts into northeastern Ennadai Lake it faces an unnamed island. Ennadai and the surrounding area has been the traditional home of the Ahiarmiut (Ihalmiut), a Caribou Inuit band.

The Ennadai Lake Meteorological Aeronautical Presentation System, a former weather station at this locale, consisted of four buildings. The Royal Canadian Corps of Signals operated a base, Ennadai Lake Radio Station, (VEJ) at Ennadai from the summer of 1949 until 18 September 1954 when it was turned over to the Department of Transportation An INCO Exploration Camp existed at Ennadai at about the same time.

Climate 
Ennadai has a subarctic climate (Köppen climate classification Dfc).

See also
 List of communities in Nunavut

References

External links
 Ennadai Lake photos
 Ennadai Lake Relocations, 1950-1960

Former populated places in the Kivalliq Region